Nedre Eiker was a municipality in Buskerud county, Norway.  It is part of the traditional region of Eiker.  The administrative centre of the municipality is the village of Mjøndalen.  The old municipality of Eiker was divided into Nedre Eiker (lower Eiker) and Øvre Eiker (upper) on 1 July 1885.

General information

Name
The Old Norse form of the name was Eikjar. The name is the plural form of eiki which means "oak wood".  The meaning of Nedre Eiker is "(the) lower (part of) Eiker".  (The municipality of Eiker was divided in 1885.)

Coat-of-arms
The coat-of-arms was granted on 26 June 1970.  The arms show three gold-colored oak leaves on a red background.  The arms are canting because the meaning of the name (Eik) comes from the word for oak.

(See also coat-of-arms of Eigersund, Songdalen, Tingvoll and Øvre Eiker)

Geography

The municipality is located in the southern part of Buskerud county.  It borders the municipalities of Lier, Drammen, Hof, and Øvre Eiker.   The majority of the residents live in the villages of Mjøndalen, Krokstadelva, Solbergelva, and Steinberg.

The Drammenselva river flows through the municipality of Nedre Eiker. It is one of the largest rivers in Norway, with a course running from Tyrifjorden in the north to Drammensfjord in the south.

Churches in Nedre Eiker
Mjøndalen Church
Nedre Eiker Church
Solberg Chapel
Tabor Chapel

Notable residents
Lars Korvald, former Prime Minister of Norway 
Herman Wildenvey (1886–1959), poet and author
 Svein Johannessen (1937–2007), international master of chess
 Jørn Hurum (b. 1967), paleontologist
 Ragnar Christiansen (born 1922), former Minister and Member of Parliament

Sister cities
The following cities are twinned with Nedre Eiker:
  Enköping, Uppsala County, Sweden

References

External links

Municipal fact sheet from Statistics Norway

Culture in Nedre Eiker on the map from Kulturnett.no

 
Municipalities of Buskerud